William Hagger Barlow (1833–1908) was the Dean of Peterborough in the Church of England from 1901 until his death in 1908.

William Hagger Barlow was born in 1833, son of Henry Hagger, Vicar of Pitsmoor, and educated at St John's College, Cambridge. Ordained in 1858, he began his career with a curacy at St James Bristol before being appointed Vicar of St Bartholomew Montpelier. After serving as Vicar of St. Ebbe's, Oxford, from 1875 he was Principal of the Church Missionary Society College, Islington and was later Vicar of St Mary's Islington. He was elevated to the Deanery in June 1901, and installed in Peterborough Cathedral 5 October 1901, preaching there for the first time the following morning

References

1833 births
Alumni of St John's College, Cambridge
Deans of Peterborough
1908 deaths